The Stonewall Awards was an annual event held by the British charity Stonewall to recognise people who have affected the lives of British lesbian, gay, bi and trans people.  The event was first held in 2006 at the Royal Academy of Arts and from 2007 was held at the Victoria and Albert Museum. It was held for the final time, with '...of the Decade' categories, in 2015.

2006

The inaugural event was held at the Royal Academy of Arts.

2007

2008

Stonewall nominated Julie Bindel for the 2008 Journalist of the Year award. This nomination was controversial due to her view on transsexualism and lead to a protest taking place outside of the awards venue.

2009

2010

2011

Held on 3 November 2011.

2012

The 2012 awards were held on 1 November, with the award of "Bigot of the Year" to Cardinal Keith O'Brien drawing protest from the Catholic Church in Scotland, of which he was head. Criticism of the bigot award from the winner of the Politician of the Year award, Ruth Davidson, lead to her being "booed off-stage".

2013

2014

2015

References

LGBT-related awards
Politics awards